The Ohio general elections, 2018, were held on November 6, 2018, throughout Ohio.

Federal

Senate

Democratic U.S. Senator Sherrod Brown—the only elected Democratic statewide officeholder in Ohio as of July 2017—won re-election to a third term, defeating Republican U.S. Representative Jim Renacci in the general election.

House of Representatives

All of Ohio's 16 seats in the United States House of Representatives were up for election in 2018.

Governor and Lieutenant Governor

Incumbent Republican Governor John Kasich and Lieutenant Governor Mary Taylor were term-limited and could not run for a third consecutive term.

Results

Attorney General

Incumbent Republican Attorney General Mike DeWine was term-limited and could not run for a third consecutive term.

Results

Secretary of State

Incumbent Republican Secretary of State Jon Husted was term-limited and could not run for a third consecutive term.

Republican primary

Candidates

Declared
 Frank LaRose, state senator

Withdrawn
 Dorothy Pelanda, state representative

Results

Democratic primary

Candidates

Declared
 Kathleen Clyde, state representative

Results

General election
Governing magazine projected the race as "leans Republican".

Endorsements

Polling
{| class=wikitable
|- valign= bottom
! Poll source
! Date(s)administered
! Samplesize
! Margin oferror
! style="width:100px;"|FrankLaRose (R)
! style="width:100px;"|KathleenClyde (D)
! Undecided
|-
| Baldwin Wallace University
| align=center| October 19–27, 2018
| align=center| 1,051
| align=center| ± 3.8%
| align=center| 33%
|  align=center| 39%
| align=center| 21%
|-
| Change Research (D-Innovation Ohio)
| align=center| August 31 – September 4, 2018
| align=center| 822
| align=center| ± 3.0%
|  align=center| 42%
| align=center| 40%
| align=center| 18%
|-
| Fallon Research
| align=center| May 21–25, 2018
| align=center| 800
| align=center| ± 3.5%
|  align=center| 32%
| align=center| 31%
|  align=center| 37%
|-
| Public Policy Polling (D-ODP)
| align=center| April 25–26, 2018
| align=center| 770
| align=center| ± 3.5%
| align=center| 40%
|  align=center| 43%
| align=center| 17%

Results

Treasurer

Incumbent Republican State Treasurer Josh Mandel was term-limited and could not run for a third consecutive term.

Republican primary

Candidates

Declared
 Sandra "Sandy" O'Brien, former Ashtabula County Auditor
 Robert Sprague, state representative

Withdrawn
 Clarence Mingo, Franklin County Auditor

Declined
 Keith Faber, state representative and former Ohio Senate President (running for state auditor)

Results

Democratic primary

Candidates

Declared
 Rob Richardson Jr., former chair of the University of Cincinnati board of trustees and candidate for Mayor of Cincinnati in 2017

Withdrawn
 Neil Patel, president and chairman of the Central Ohio Chapter of the Federation of Indian Associations

Declined
 Jeremy Blake, Newark City Councilman (running for state representative)

Results

General election

Endorsements

Polling
{| class=wikitable
|- valign= bottom
! Poll source
! Date(s)administered
! Samplesize
! Margin oferror
! style="width:100px;"|RobertSprague (R)
! style="width:100px;"|RobRichardson (D)
! style="width:100px;"|PaulCurry (G)
! Undecided
|-
| Baldwin Wallace University
| align=center| October 19–27, 2018
| align=center| 1,051
| align=center| ± 3.8%
| align=center| 36%
|  align=center| 38%
| align=center| –
| align=center| 22%
|-
| Change Research (D-Innovation Ohio)
| align=center| August 31 – September 4, 2018
| align=center| 822
| align=center| ± 3.0%
|  align=center| 41%
| align=center| 38%
| align=center| —
| align=center| 21%
|-
| Fallon Research
| align=center| May 21–25, 2018
| align=center| 800
| align=center| ± 3.5%
|  align=center| 33%
| align=center| 30%
| align=center| 5%
| align=center| 32%

Results

Auditor

Incumbent Republican State Auditor Dave Yost was term-limited and could not run for a third consecutive term.

Republican primary

Candidates

Declared
 Keith Faber, state representative and former Ohio Senate President

Declined
 Cliff Rosenberger, Speaker of the Ohio House of Representatives

Results

Democratic primary

Candidates

Declared
 Zack Space, former U.S. Representative

Failed to qualify
 Kelli Prather, occupational therapist, candidate for U.S. Senate in 2016, candidate for Cincinnati City Council in 2017

Results

General election

Endorsements

Polling
{| class=wikitable
|- valign= bottom
! Poll source
! Date(s)administered
! Samplesize
! Margin oferror
! style="width:100px;"|KeithFaber (R)
! style="width:100px;"|ZackSpace (D)
! Undecided
|-
| Baldwin Wallace University
| align=center| October 19–27, 2018
| align=center| 1,051
| align=center| ± 3.8%
| align=center| 32%
|  align=center| 40%
| align=center| 22%
|-
| Change Research (D-Innovation Ohio)
| align=center| August 31 – September 4, 2018
| align=center| 822
| align=center| ± 3.0%
|  align=center| 40%
| align=center| 37%
| align=center| 23%
|-
| Fallon Research
| align=center| May 21–25, 2018
| align=center| 800
| align=center| ± 3.5%
| align=center| 32%
|  align=center| 35%
| align=center| 33%

Results

General Assembly

Senate

The 17 odd-numbered districts out of 33 seats in the Ohio Senate were up for election in 2018. Before the election, nine of these seats were held by Republicans, seven were held by Democrats, and one was vacant.

House of Representatives

All 99 seats in the Ohio House of Representatives were up for election in 2018. Before the election, 65 of these seats were held by Republicans, 33 were held by Democrats, and one seat was vacant.

Supreme Court

While judicial races in Ohio are technically non-partisan (party affiliations are not listed on the ballot), candidates run in party primaries. Terms are six years, and justices may run for re-election an unlimited number of times before their 70th birthday.

Associate Justice (Term commencing 01/01/2019)
Incumbent Associate Justice Terrence O'Donnell, a Republican, did not seek reelection as he had reached the mandatory retirement age.

Republican primary

Candidates
Craig Baldwin, incumbent Judge of the Ohio Court of Appeals for the 5th District

Results

Democratic primary

Candidates
 Michael P. Donnelly, Cuyahoga County Court of Common Pleas judge

Results

General election

Results

Associate Justice (Term commecning 01/02/2019)
Incumbent Associate Justice Mary DeGenaro, a Republican, sought a full-term after being appointed by Governor John Kasich, following the resignation of Justice William O' Neill, a Democrat.

Republican primary

Candidates
Mary DeGenaro, incumbent Associate Justice of the Supreme Court of Ohio

Results

Democratic primary

Candidates
Melody J. Stewart, incumbent Judge of the Ohio Court of Appeals for the 8th District

Results

General election

Results

Court of Appeals

The Ohio District Courts of Appeals consists of 69 judges in 12 districts. Judges serve a 6-year term. Approximately 1/3 of these positions were up for election in 2018.

District 1

Term commencing 02/09/2019

Term commencing 02/10/2019

Term commencing 02/11/2019

Term commencing 02/12/2019

District 2

Term commencing 02/09/2019

District 3

Term commencing 02/09/2019

District 4

Term commencing 02/09/2019

Term commencing 02/10/2019

District 5

Term commencing 02/09/2019

Term commencing 02/10/2019

Term commencing 02/11/2019

District 6

Term commencing 02/09/2019

District 7

Term commencing 02/09/2019

District 8

Term commencing 01/01/2019

Term commencing 01/02/2019

Term commencing 01/03/2019

Term commencing 02/09/2019

District 9

Term commencing 02/09/2019

District 10

Term commencing 02/09/2019

Term commencing 02/10/2019

District 11

Term commencing 02/09/2019

Term commencing 02/10/2019

District 12

Term commencing 02/09/2019

State Board of Education

Notes

References

External links
Candidates at Vote Smart 
Candidates at Ballotpedia
Campaign finance at OpenSecrets

Official campaign websites for attorney general candidates
Steve Dettelbach (D) for Attorney General
Dave Yost (R) for Attorney General

Official campaign websites for secretary of state candidates
Kathleen Clyde (D) for Secretary of State
Frank LaRose (R) for Secretary of State

Official campaign websites for treasurer candidates
Rob Richardson (D) for Treasurer
Robert Sprague (R) for Treasurer

Official campaign websites for auditor candidates
Keith Faber (R) for Auditor
Zack Space (D) for Auditor

 
Ohio